West Airlines Co. Ltd., operating as West Air, is a low-cost airline based in New North Zone, Chongqing, China, operating a scheduled passenger network to domestic and international destinations out of its hub, Chongqing Jiangbei International Airport. The company was established in March 2006 by its parent company Hainan Airlines, with the launch of scheduled services on 14 July 2010. The airline is one of the four founding members of the U-FLY Alliance.

On 4 February 2016, West Air launched its inaugural international flight between Chongqing and Singapore.

Destinations
West Air serves 36 destinations, with South Korea and Myanmar the only two markets outside of China.

Fleet

Current fleet 

, the West Air fleet consists of only Airbus aircraft:

Fleet History
West Air has previously operated the following aircraft:
5 Boeing 737-300

Loyalty programs 

The Fortune Wings Club is the loyalty program for West Air and its sister airlines, including Capital Airlines, Tianjin Airlines, Grand China Air, Grand China Express, Hainan Airlines, Hong Kong Airlines, Hong Kong Express and Lucky Air. Membership benefits include air ticket redemption and upgrade; VIP members have additional privileges of dedicated First or Business Class check in counters, lounge access, bonus mileage and extra baggage allowance.

See also 
 List of airlines of China

References

External links 

  
 Hainan Airlines

Airlines established in 2007
Airlines of China
Low-cost carriers
Companies based in Chongqing
HNA Group
Chinese brands
U-FLY Alliance